The Cadillac Evoq (pronounced "evoke") was a concept car designed by Cadillac and unveiled at the 1999 Detroit Auto Show. Many of the Evoq's design features were incorporated into the Cadillac XLR. The vehicle was a project begun under the-then General Manager of Cadillac, John Smith. Intended as a "Statement of Brand Character", it presaged Cadillacs to come afterwards such as the CTS, SRX, XLR and so forth. The Evoq was built by Metalcrafters of California in 1998. Its engine was the first Northstar designed for rear wheel drive use.

References 

Evoq